Stuart Emerson is a background vocalist and session musician playing drums, bass, keyboards and guitar. He has worked on albums for artists including Meat Loaf and Bonnie Tyler.

His first recordings were with NWOBHM band Emerson which included Simon Blewitt (a.k.a. Sam Blue), Stuart Emerson, Brian Emerson, Dru Irving, Jon Sellers. They released their debut single "Something Special" in 1983 on Neat Records without much commercial success. Other members of the band who did not appear on the single include Charles McKenzie, Rich Manley-Reeve and Mick White (later of Samson).

Emerson met singer Lorraine Crosby in Newcastle upon Tyne when he was looking for a backing singer for his band. They began writing together, and also became a couple. In the early 1990s, Crosby sent songwriter and producer Jim Steinman some demos of songs she had written with Emerson. Steinman asked to meet them, and the couple decided that they would move to New York City to give their careers a boost. They then followed Steinman after he moved to Los Angeles, living in the Magic Hotel, where all of Meat Loaf's band were staying, until they could find somewhere permanent to live. Crosby performed on song "I'd Do Anything for Love (But I Won't Do That)", but as she recorded the track as guide vocals, she did not receive any royalties. The couple eventually returned to England with little money.

He is currently performing in a soul/Motown covers band with his partner Lorraine Crosby, appearing regularly at social clubs and holiday camps in England.

Notable appearances include:

References

Year of birth missing (living people)
Living people
British session musicians